Oscar Clifford Bell (March 15, 1880 – August 1, 1936) was an American football player and coach. He served as the head football coach at Monmouth College in Monmouth, Illinois, where he led his team to two successful seasons in 1905 and 1906. His squads recorded a record of 18–1.  In 1907, he moved to North Missouri Normal School of the First District—now known as Truman State University—in Kirksville, Missouri, where his teams compiled a record of 13–7 inthree seasons.  Bell played college football for one season, in 1900, at the University of Illinois.

References

1880 births
1936 deaths
American football fullbacks
Illinois Fighting Illini football players
Monmouth Fighting Scots football coaches
Truman Bulldogs football coaches
High school football coaches in Ohio
People from Henderson County, Illinois
Players of American football from Illinois